The Tug Fork is a tributary of the Big Sandy River,  long, in southwestern West Virginia, southwestern Virginia, and eastern Kentucky in the United States. Via the Big Sandy and Ohio rivers, it is part of the watershed of the Mississippi River.

It is also known as the Tug Fork River or as the Tug River.  The United States Board on Geographic Names settled on "Tug Fork" as the stream's official name in 1975.

The Tug Fork rises in the Appalachian Mountains of extreme southwestern West Virginia, in southern McDowell County, near the Virginia state line. It flows in a meandering course through the mountains generally northwest, past Welch. For the remainder of its course it forms part of the boundary between West Virginia (east) and Kentucky (west), flowing northwest past Williamson, West Virginia. It joins the Levisa Fork at Louisa, Kentucky to form the Big Sandy.

The river flows through an especially remote mountainous region in its upper course. The river valley between Pike County, Kentucky and Mingo County, West Virginia was the scene of the infamous Hatfield–McCoy feud in the late 19th century.

Toponymist George R. Stewart writes about the origin of the name "Tug Fork". In 1756 a small army of Virginians and Cherokees conducted the Sandy Creek Expedition against the Shawnee.  At one point they killed and ate two buffaloes and hung their hides on a tree.  Later they returned and, being out of provisions, took the hides and cut them into thin strips called "tugs".  These they roasted and ate.  For this reason, the story goes, the stream was given the name "Tug."  Stewart also points out another possible origin.  Even if the story is true, the second explanation may have reinforced the name. In the Cherokee language "tugulu" refers to the forks of a stream, as in the Tugaloo River and other streams in former Cherokee lands named "tug".

See also

List of Kentucky rivers
List of Virginia rivers
List of West Virginia rivers
River borders of U.S. states
Martin County Sludge Spill

References

External links

Hatfield-McCoy: Reunion of the Millennium

Rivers of Kentucky
Rivers of Virginia
Rivers of West Virginia
Borders of West Virginia
Borders of Kentucky
Rivers of Wayne County, West Virginia
Rivers of Mingo County, West Virginia
Rivers of McDowell County, West Virginia
Landforms of Buchanan County, Virginia
Rivers of Pike County, Kentucky
Rivers of Martin County, Kentucky
Rivers of Lawrence County, Kentucky